Royd may refer to:

Royd Anderson (born 1972), Cuban-American filmmaker
Royd Chambers (1961), American politician

See also

Fox Royd, an area of Thornhill, West Yorkshire, England
Hebden Royd, a civil parish in West Yorkshire, England
Royd House, in Hale, Greater Manchester, England
Royd Mill, Oldham, in Greater Manchester, England
Royd Moor Wind Farm, in South Yorkshire, England